Douglas George Westland (3 April 1909 – June 1998) was a Scottish footballer who played in the English Football League for Stoke City. His brother James Westland was also a footballer who played for Stoke City.

Career
Westland was born in Aberdeen and played for Banks O' Dee and Aberdeen along with his brother James, and they both signed for English club Stoke City in 1936. Douglas struggled to make much of an impact at the Victoria Ground failing to take over from Norman Wilkinson. He spent three seasons at Stoke making just six appearances and later played for Barlaston St Giles and Raith Rovers.

Career statistics
Source:

References

Scottish footballers
Aberdeen F.C. players
Stoke City F.C. players
English Football League players
Scottish Football League players
1909 births
1998 deaths
Footballers from Aberdeen
Association football goalkeepers
Banks O' Dee F.C. players
Raith Rovers F.C. players